Puchalapalli Sundarayya  (Born Sundararami Reddy on 1 May 1913 – 19 May 1985) popularly known as Comrade PS was an Indian Communist politician leader including of the peasant revolt in the former Hyderabad State of India, called the Telangana Rebellion and he was also one of the founding members of Communist Party of India (Marxist). He was so dedicated to the upliftment of the poor that he and his spouse chose not to have children, for the purpose of social service. He directly participated in Telangana armed struggle against the imperialism of the Nizam of Hyderabad. Sundarayya remained General Secretary of Communist Party of India (Marxist) until 1976.

Early life
Sundarayya was born on 1 May 1913 in Alaganipadu (in the present Vidavalur Mandal of Kovur Constituency) in Nellore district of Andhra Pradesh, India. He was the child of a feudal family and, when Sundarayya was six, his father died. He completed primary education and entered a college where he studied at entry level until he left in 1930, at the age of 17, to join Gandhi's Non-Cooperation Movement. He was arrested and spent time in a  Borstal school in Rajahmundry where he became acquainted with various communists and local dalit leaders. When released, he organized agricultural workers in his village to protest against bonded labour. He was mentored by Amir Hyder Khan, who prompted him to become a member of the Communist Party of India, which was condemned and banned by the British government during the Second World War. During this period many prominent communist leaders, like Dinkar Mehta, Sajjad Zaheer, E.M.S. Namboodiripad and Soli Batliwala, became members of the national executive of the Congress Socialist Party. While a member, Sundarayya rose to the position of the Secretary of the Congress Socialist Party. After the arrest of Amir Hyder Khan, following the directions of the Central Committee, the task of building the Party in South India fell on his shoulders. During this period, he motivated transition of prominent communist leaders of Kerala like E. M. S. Namboodiripad and P. Krishna Pillai to join the Communist Party of India from the Congress Socialist Party. In 1934, Sundarayya became a member of the Central Committee of the Communist Party of India. During the same year, he became one of the founders of the All India Kisan Sabha and was elected as its joint secretary. When the Party was banned, he went underground between 1939 and 1942.

Telangana Rebellion
When the ban on the Party was lifted in 1943, the first Party Congress was held at Bombay and he was again elected to the Central Committee in the second party Congress held at Calcutta (now called: Kolkata). In that Congress, the Communist Party of India adopted a line advocating armed struggle, that came to be known as 'Calcutta thesis'. It was closely identified with its main proponent, the then General Secretary B.T. Ranadive. As a result, insurgencies took place in Tripura, Telangana, West Bengal and Travancore. The most important rebellion took place in Telangana, against the Nizam of Hyderabad state. Sundarayya, was one of its leaders. He went underground between 1948 and 1952. He was re-elected to the Central Committee in 1952 when a special party conference was held. He was also elected to the Politburo, the highest forum within the Party. He was then re-elected to Central Committee and the Politburo in the third party congress in Vijayawada and again in the fourth congress held at Palakkad.

In Communist Party of India (Marxist)
He was elected to the Central Executive and the Central Secretariat of the Party at the fifth Party Congress at Amritsar. At this time the internal conflict within the Communist Party of India had heightened. The Party leadership under S.A. Dange were in favor of supporting the Indian Government headed by the Indian National Congress at the time of the Sino-Indian War. Also, following the Sino-Soviet differences of International Communist Movement, the Party leadership under Dange was pursuing the USSR line, which the pro-Chinese leadership within the Party called revisionist. The group under Dange was referred to as the "Rightists", and the other group, "Leftists". Sundarayya was a prominent leader of the leftist group and he resigned the positions conferred upon him during the Amritsar congress of the Party, protesting against the policies of the dominant leadership of the Party. He was arrested and imprisoned during November 1962 at the time of India-China border war. The split came out in open and the leftists organized the Seventh Party Congress in October–November 1964 and forming a new Party called the Communist Party of India (Marxist). Sundarayya was elected as its General Secretary. However, immediately after this conference, Sundarayya and several Party leaders were arrested because of a ruling produced by the Congress government, and they were detained until May 1966. Again, he went underground to evade arrest during the period of the then Indian Prime Minister, Indira Gandhi, who evoked Emergency provisions of the Indian Constitution, between 1975–1977, to suspend Constitutionally guaranteed 'fundamental rights'. Sundarayya remained the Party's General Secretary until 1976. In that year, he decided to resign from his post as the Party's General Secretary and gave up his Politburo membership, for what he called the "revisionist habits" acquired by the Party.

Legislative career
In 1952, he was elected to the Upper House of the Indian Parliament, the Rajya Sabha from the Madras Assembly constituency and became the leader of the Communist group in Parliament. He went to Parliament on a bicycle at a time when most of the MPs were either zamindars or hailed from aristocratic families who arrived in luxury cars. He was elected to the State assembly of Andhra Pradesh and remained a member of that House until 1967. After a long gap he contested again and got elected to the State assembly of Andhra Pradesh in 1978, he continued this up to 1983. Sundarayya held the party's state Secretary post in Andhra Pradesh and was a member of the Central Committee of the Party from this period to his death on 19 May 1985.

External links

 History on the verge of collapse in Hindu on 03-May-2006.
 Remembrance, P. Sundarayya in Marxist daily Ganashakthi website.
 P. Sundarayya, Telengana People's Struggle and Its Lessons, December 1972, Published by the Communist Party of India (Marxist), Calcutta-29.

References

Communist Party of India (Marxist) politicians from Andhra Pradesh
1913 births
1985 deaths
Telugu politicians
Indian atheists
Leaders of the Opposition in the Andhra Pradesh Legislative Assembly
General Secretaries of the Communist Party of India (Marxist)